Seahorse Mercator is a navigational training vessel operated by Defence Maritime Services under contract to the Royal Australian Navy (RAN).

Design and construction
Seahorse Mercator is a variant of the  design. Propulsion is supplied by two Caterpillar 3304 diesels, driving two propellers. Seahorse Mercator is run by a crew of five plus three instructors, and can carry up to eighteen trainees. Radars include a Furuno FE 606 navigation radar, and a Decca Bridgemaster ARPA navigation radar. The vessel is unarmed.

Seahorse Mercator was built by Tenix Ship Building Western Australia for DMS at a cost of A$4 million. The vessel was launched on 15 October 1998. The Canadian Forces Maritime Command's s were built to a modified variant of Seahorse Mercators design.

Operational history
Since then she has mainly operated in the Sydney area and has trained RAN personnel and sailors from other navies in coastal navigation, ship handling and watch keeping procedures.

Seahorse Mercator has a secondary role as a mine countermeasures craft.

References

Training ships of the Royal Australian Navy
1998 ships
Pacific Forum class patrol vessels